Samoniny (German language: Samonienen, 1938-1945 Klarfließ) is a village in the administrative district of Gmina Gołdap, within Gołdap County, Warmian-Masurian Voivodeship, in northern Poland, close to the border with the Kaliningrad Oblast of Russia.

References

Samoniny